Galium concinnum, the shining bedstraw, is a herbaceous perennial plant species in the Rubiaceae family. It is native to the Midwestern United States and central Canada, especially the Great Lakes Region and the Valleys of the Ohio, lower Missouri, and upper Mississippi Rivers. It is commonly found in deciduous forests and forest edges. It grows low to the ground in natural habitats. Although it is not an invasive species, it can be very weedy. It is typically not cultivated.

Description
Galium concinnum is a herbaceous perennial plant that trails low to the ground and has a delicate appearance. The plant is short, ranging from 15-63cm in height.The stems are thin and fragile, have nearly microscopic (0.05-0.1mm) hairs, and typically branch once at a node. The leaves are small, long, and slender typically 2-3mm wide and ~1-2cm long. The leaves appear in groups of 6 as whorls surrounding each stem node. At some branching nodes there are only 4 leaves to a node. The inflorescences are compound cyme, branching 2-3 times. Flowers are usually at the terminal ends of the inflorescence branches and are small (2-3mm wide), white, and have 4 petals. The fruits are smooth, round, small (1-5-2.3mm) and come in pairs.

Habitat
Galium concinnum is native to the Midwestern United States and the Canadian province of Ontario. It is found in a wide range of habitats including mesic soils near lakes, rivers, and woodland edges. It can also be found in deciduous upland forests, bluffs, and even sandy or rocky woodlands.

Etymology
Galium means milk; it is Dioscorides’ name. Concinnum means 'well proportioned' or 'symmetrical'.

History 
There are not many short-term trends connected to Gallium concinnum because there have not been enough populations researched to have good findings. There are three historical locations where it can be found, but one of these locations has been destroyed completely. There are also some long-term trends. For example, it has been common to New York for four decades, but there is little information on its condition, size, and threats.

Uses 
Galium concinnum (shinning bedstraw) was mostly used for stuffing beds. It was also a treatment for skin conditions. It was ground up into a powder to help inflammation and speed up the healing process of skin wounds. It also helps urinary tract problems. It does this by helping clean out the urinary tract.

References

External links
Photo of herbarium specimen at Missouri Botanical Garden, collected in Missouri, Galium concinnum 
Minnesota Wildflowers, shining bedstraw, Galium concinnum
Illinois Wildflowers, shining bedstraw, Galium concinnum
Altervista Photo Gallery, line drawing of Galium concinnum

concinnum
Flora of North America
Plants described in 1841